The buffy-fronted seedeater (Sporophila frontalis) is a species of bird in the family Thraupidae.

It is found in eastern South America, mainly in far northeastern Argentina and along the southeastern Brazilian coastline. Its natural habitats are subtropical or tropical moist lowland forest and subtropical or tropical moist montane forest. It is threatened by habitat loss.

References

External links

 Buffy-fronted Seedeater – photos and text. arthurgrosset.com

buffy-fronted seedeater
Birds of Argentina
Birds of the Atlantic Forest
buffy-fronted seedeater
Taxonomy articles created by Polbot